The Physciaceae are a family of mostly lichen-forming fungi belonging to the class Lecanoromycetes in the division Ascomycota.  A 2016 estimate placed 19 genera and 601 species in the family.

Genera
This is a list of the genera contained within the Physciaceae, based on a 2020 review and summary of ascomycete classification. Following the genus name is the taxonomic authority, year of publication, and the number of species:
Anaptychia  – about 15 spp.
Coscinocladium  – 2 spp.
Heterodermia  – about 90 spp.
Hyperphyscia  – 9 spp.
Kashiwadia  – 1 sp.
Leucodermia  – 10 spp.
Mischoblastia  – 3 spp.
Mobergia  – 1 sp.
Oxnerella  – 1 spp.
Phaeophyscia  – 66 spp.
Phaeorrhiza  – 2 spp.
Physcia  – about 80 spp.
Physciella  – 4 spp.
Physconia  – about 25 spp.
Polyblastidium  – 18 spp.
Rinodina   – about 300 spp
Rinodinella   – 6 spp.
Tornabea  – 1 spp.

The genus Culbersonia, previously classified in the Physciaceae due to its morphological features, has been shown with molecular phylogenetics to belong to the Caliciaceae.

References

Caliciales
Lichen families
Lecanoromycetes families
Taxa named by Alexander Zahlbruckner
Taxa described in 1898